Aniconism in Islam is the avoidance of images (aniconism) of sentient beings in some forms of Islamic art. Islamic aniconism stems in part from the prohibition of idolatry and in part from the belief that the creation of living forms is God's prerogative.

The Quran does not explicitly prohibit visual representation of any living being. The corpus of hadith (sayings attributed to the Islamic prophet Muhammad) contains more explicit prohibitions of images of living beings, challenging painters to "breathe life" into their images and threatening them with punishment on the Day of Judgment. Muslims have interpreted these prohibitions in different ways in different times and places. Religious Islamic art has been typically characterized by the absence of figures and extensive use of calligraphic, geometric and abstract floral patterns.

However, representations of Muhammad (in some cases, with his face concealed) and other religious figures are found in some manuscripts from lands to the east of Anatolia, such as Persia and India. These pictures were meant to illustrate the story and not to infringe on the Islamic prohibition of idolatry, but many Muslims regard such images as forbidden. In secular art of the Muslim world, representations of human and animal forms historically flourished in nearly all Islamic cultures, although, partly because of opposing religious sentiments, figures in paintings were often stylized, giving rise to a variety of decorative figural designs. There were episodes of iconoclastic destruction of figurative art, such as the temporary decree by the Umayyad caliph Yazid II in 721 CE ordering the destruction of all representational images in his realm. A number of historians have seen an Islamic influence on the Byzantine iconoclastic movement of the 8th century, though others regard this is as a legend that arose in later times in the Byzantine empire.

Theological views
The Quran, the Islamic holy book, does not explicitly prohibit the depiction of human figures; it merely condemns idolatry. Interdictions of figurative representation are present in the hadith, among a dozen of the hadith recorded during the latter part of the period when they were being written down. Because these hadith are tied to particular events in the life of the Islamic prophet Muhammad, they need to be interpreted in order to be applied in any general manner.

There are variations between religious  (schools) and marked differences between different branches of Islam. Aniconism is common among fundamentalist Sunni sects such as Salafis and Wahhabis (which are also often iconoclastic), and less prevalent among liberal movements within Islam. Shia and mystical orders also have less stringent views on aniconism. On the individual level, whether or not specific Muslims believe in aniconism may depend on how much credence is given to hadith, and how liberal or strict they are in personal practice.

Aniconism in Islam not only deals with the material image, but touches upon mental representations as well. It is a problematic issue, discussed by early theologians, as to how to describe God, Muhammad and other prophets, and, indeed, if it is permissible at all to do so. God is usually represented by immaterial attributes, such as "holy" or "merciful", commonly known from his "Ninety-nine beautiful names". Of no less interest is the validity of sightings of holy personages made during dreams.

Titus Burckhardt sums up the role of aniconism in Islamic aesthetics as follows:

In practice

Religious core 
In practice, the core of normative religion in Islam is consistently aniconic. Spaces such as the mosque and objects like the Quran are devoid of figurative images. Other spheres of religion, for example mysticism, popular piety, or private devotion exhibit significant variability in this regard. Aniconism in secular contexts is even more variable and there are many examples of figural representation in secular art throughout history. Generally speaking, aniconism in Islamic societies is restricted in modern times to specific religious contexts. In the past, it was enforced only in some times and places.

Past
The representation of living beings in Islamic art is not just a modern phenomenon and examples are found from the earliest periods of Islamic history. Frescos and reliefs of humans and animals adorned palaces of the Umayyad era, as on the famous Mshatta Facade now in Berlin. The ‘Abbasid Palaces at Samarra also contained figurative imagery. Ceramics, metalware, and objects in ivory, rock crystal, and other media also bore figural imagery in the medieval era. Figurative miniatures in books occur later in most Islamic countries but somewhat less in Arabic-speaking areas. The human figure is central to the Persian miniature and other traditions such as the Ottoman miniature and Mughal painting. The Persian miniature tradition began when Persian courts were dominated by Sunnis, but continued after the Shia Safavid dynasty took power. The Safavid ruler Shah Tahmasp I of Persia began his reign as a keen patron and amateur artist himself, but turned against painting and other forbidden activities after a religious midlife crisis.

The avoidance of idolatry is the main concern of the restrictions on images, and as a result, the traditional form for the religious cult image, the free-standing sculpture, is extremely rare, though examples of freestanding human sculpture do occur in Umayyad Syria and in Seljuk Iran. The Pisa Griffin, of a mythical beast and designed to spout water for a fountain, is the largest example, at three feet tall in bronze, and probably only survives because it was taken as booty by the city of Pisa in the Middle Ages. Like the famous lions supporting a fountain in the Alhambra, it probably came from Al-Andalus. The griffin and lions cannot easily be regarded as potential idols, given their submissive position (and the lack of religions worshipping lions or griffins), and the same is true of small decorative figures in relief on objects in metalwork, or figures painted on Islamic pottery, both of which are relatively common. In particular hunting scenes of humans and animals were popular, and presumably regarded as clearly having no religious function. The figures in miniatures were, until the late 16th century, always numerous in each image, small (typically only an inch or two high), and showing the central figures at roughly the same size as the attendants and servants who are usually also shown, thus deflecting potential accusations of idolatry. The books illustrated were most often the classics of Persian poetry and historical chronicles.

The hadith show some concessions for context, as with the dolls, and condemn most strongly the makers rather than the owners of images. A long tradition of prefaces to muraqqas sought to justify the creation of images without getting involved in discussions of the specific texts, using arguments such as comparing God to an artist.

Miniature painting was mostly patronized by the court circle and is a private form of art; the owner chooses whom to show a book or muraqqa (album). But wall-paintings with large figures were found in early Islam, and in Safavid and later Persia, especially from the 17th century, but were always rare in the Arabic-speaking world. Such paintings are also mainly found in private palaces; examples in public buildings are rare though not unknown, in Iran there are even some in mosques.

Eschewing figural representation, ornamentation in Islamic sacred architecture relies chiefly on arabesque and geometrical patterns.

Early examples of non-figural representation in Islamic sacred architecture are found in the Umayyad Mosque of Damascus and the Dome of the Rock. The murals of the Dome of the Rock use crowns and jewels to symbolize earthly rulership and "otherworldly" plants as an invocation of the Quranic description of heaven. Similarly, the murals in the Umayyad Mosque of Damascus, which depict an idyllic cityscape are also meant to be an evocation of paradise without figural representation.

The issue of aniconism has posed problems in the modern world, especially as technologies like television developed in the 20th century. For many years, Wahhabi clerics opposed the establishment of a television service in Saudi Arabia, as they believed it immoral to produce images of humans. The introduction of television in 1965 offended some Saudis, and one of King Faisal's nephews, Prince Khalid ibn Musa'id ibn 'Abd al-'Aziz, was killed in a police shootout in August 1965 after he led an assault on one of the new television stations.

Present
Depending on which segment of Islamic societies are referred to, the application of aniconism is characterized by noteworthy differences. Factors are the epoch considered, the country, the religious orientation, the political intent, the popular beliefs, the private benefit or the dichotomy between reality and discourse.

Today, the concept of an aniconic Islam coexists with a daily life for Muslims awash with images. TV stations and newspapers (which do present still and moving representations of living beings) have an exceptional impact on public opinion, sometimes, as in the case of Al Jazeera, with a global reach, beyond the Arabic speaking and Muslim audience. Portraits of secular and religious leaders are omnipresent on banknotes and coins, in streets and offices (e.g. presidents like Nasser and Mubarak, Arafat, al-Assad, kings like House of Saud or Hezbollah's Nasrallah and Ayatollah Khomeini). Anthropomorphic statues in public places are to be found in most Muslim countries (Saddam Hussein's are infamous), as well as art schools training sculptors and painters. In the Egyptian countryside, it is fashionable to celebrate and advertise the returning of pilgrims from Mecca on the walls of their houses.

The Taliban movement in Afghanistan banned photography and destroyed non-Muslim artifacts, especially carvings and statues such as the Buddhas of Bamiyan, generally tolerated by other Muslims, on the grounds that the artifacts are idolatrous or shirk. However, sometimes those who profess aniconism will practice figurative representation (cf. portraits of Talibans from the Kandahar photographic studios during their imposed ban on photography).

For Shia communities, portraits of the major figures of Shiite history are important elements of religious devotion. In Iran, portraits of Muhammad and of Ali, printed on pieces of cloth or woven into carpets, are called temsal ("likenesses") and can be bought around shrines and in the streets, to be hung in homes or carried with oneself. In Pakistan, India and Bangladesh portraits of Ali can be found on notoriously ornate trucks, buses and rickshaws. Contrary to the Sunni tradition, a photographic picture of the deceased can be placed on the Shiite tombs. A curiosity in Iran is an Orientalist photography supposed to represent Muhammad as a young boy. The Grand Ayatollah Sistani of Najaf in Iraq has given a fatwā declaring the depiction of Muhammad, the prophets and other holy characters, permissible if it is made with the utmost respect.

Circumvention methods
Medieval Muslim artists found various ways to represent especially sensitive figures such as Muhammad. He is sometimes shown with a fiery halo hiding his face, head, or whole body, and from about 1500 is often shown with a veiled face. Members of his immediate family and other prophets may be treated in the same way. At the material level, prophets in manuscripts can have their face covered by a veil or all humans have a stroke drawn over their neck, symbolizing the severing of the soul, and clarifying the fact that it is not something alive and imbued with a soul that is depicted: a purposeful flaw to make what is depicted impossible to live in reality (as merely impossible in reality is still often frowned upon or banned, such as representations of comic book characters or unicorns, although exceptions do exist). Few portraits were attempted, and the ability to create recognizable portraits was rare in Islamic art until the Mughal tradition began in the late 15th century, although in both Mughal India and Ottoman Turkey portraits of the ruler then became very popular in court circles.

Islamic calligraphy has also displayed figurative themes. Examples of this are anthropomorphic and zoomorphic calligrams. Islamic calligraphy forms evolved, especially in the Ottoman period, to fulfill a function similar to figurative art. When on paper, Islamic calligraphy is often seen with elaborate frames of Ottoman illumination. Examples of Islamic calligraphy using this technique include the name of Muhammad, the Hilya (a tablet that embodies the description of Muhammad’s physical appearance), multiple names of God in Islam, and the tughra (a calligraphic version of the name of an Ottoman sultan).

Scriptural basis

Hadith and exegesis examples
During its early days, aniconism in Islam was intended as a measure against idolatry, particularly against the statues worshipped by pagans. In several hadith Muhammad encountered pictures of animate objects or dolls and expressed his disapproval, sometimes commenting on the punishment in hellfire awaiting those who created the objects.  All hadith presented in this section are Sunni, not Shia.

To show the superiority of the monotheist faith, Muhammad smashed the idols at the Kaaba. He also removed paintings that were blasphemous to Islam, while protecting others (the images of Mary and Jesus) inside the building. The hadith below emphasizes that aniconism depends not only on what, but also on how things are depicted.

Although pagans in Muhammad's times also worshiped trees and stones, Muhammad opposed only images of animated beings — humans and animals —, as reported by the hadith. Subsequently, geometrical ornamentation became a sophisticated art form in Islam.

Muhammad also warned his followers of dying amongst people that built places of worship at graves and placed pictures in it (i.e. Christians).

Muhammad made it very clear that angels do not like pictures.

See also

 Aniconism in Christianity
 Aniconism in Judaism
 Arabic miniature 
 Censorship by religion
 Censorship in Islamic societies
 Criticism of Twelver Shia Islam#Image veneration
 Destruction of cultural heritage by ISIL
 Destruction of early Islamic heritage sites in Saudi Arabia
 Jyllands-Posten Muhammad cartoons controversy
 Taghut

Notes

References

General
Jack Goody, Representations and Contradictions: Ambivalence Towards Images, Theatre, Fiction, Relics and Sexuality, London, Blackwell Publishers, 1997. .

Islam
Oleg Grabar, "Postscriptum", The Formation of Islamic Art, Yale University, 1987 (p209). 
Terry Allen, "Aniconism and Figural Representation in Islamic Art", Five Essays on Islamic Art, Occidental (CA), Solipsist, 1988.  Aniconism and Figural Representation in Islamic Art, by Terry Allen
 Gilbert Beaugé & Jean-François Clément, L'image dans le monde arabe [The image in the Arab world], Paris, CNRS Éditions, 1995,  
 Rudi Paret, Das islamische Bilderverbot und die Schia [The Islamic prohibition of images and the Shi'a], Erwin Gräf (ed.), Festschrift Werner Caskel, Leiden, 1968, 224-32. 

Islam
Censorship in Islam
Iconoclasm
Islamic art